Oh The Things Mommies Do! What Could Be Better Than Having Two? is a 2009 children's book geared toward lesbian mothers, written by Crystal Tompkins and illustrated by Lindsey Evans.

Press 
The book has been featured in several publications in the United States as well as in the United Kingdom. Such publications include: Echelon Magazine, Gay UK News, and Proud Parenting Magazine among many others.

References

External links
 

2000s LGBT literature
Lesbian non-fiction books